Daniel Tanveer Batth (born 21 September 1990) is an English professional footballer who plays as a defender for Sunderland.

Batth began his career with his local side Wolverhampton Wanderers, joining their youth academy as a teenager. In order to gain first-team experience he spent time out on loan at Colchester United, Sheffield United and Sheffield Wednesday (twice). He broke into Wolves' first team in 2012–13, and was made captain by Kenny Jackett for the 2013–14 season as Wolves won the League One title, with Batth being named in the PFA Team of the Year.

Batth remained a key member of the Wolves team as the play-offs were narrowly missed in 2014–15 before promotion to the Premier League was gained in 2017–18. After not being considered by Nuno Espírito Santo for his Premier League squad, Batth joined Middlesbrough on loan in August 2018. Batth moved to Stoke City in January 2019 for a fee of £3 million. Batth spent three years at Stoke, making 107 appearacnes, before joining Sunderland in January 2022.

Club career

Wolverhampton Wanderers

Early career
Born in Brierley Hill, West Midlands, Batth joined the Wolverhampton Wanderers Academy at the age of 15. He attended Thorns Community College. He captained the youth team and overcame a dislocated shoulder in his reserve team debut, aged 16. He was one of seven academy graduates to sign a professional deal at the end of the 2008–09 season.

Loan to Colchester United
Batth had his first taste of first-team football when he was signed by Aidy Boothroyd for League One club Colchester United on loan on 17 September 2009. He made his Football League and professional debut two days later, starting in central defence alongside Magnus Okuonghae in a 2–0 win over Hartlepool United and earning the man of the match award. After making five starts during his first month with the club, Batth's loan was extended until the end of the season at the Colchester Community Stadium. He scored his first professional goal to secure a 1–0 victory against Oldham Athletic on 20 February 2010, nodding home a David Prutton corner to extend Colchester's run of games undefeated to five. Batth made 17 league starts for Colchester and made one substitute appearance, scoring one goal. Colchester occupied a play-off position during a large part of Batth's spell.

Loan to Sheffield United
On his return to Molineux, Batth was named "Young Professional of the Year" at the club's end of season dinner. Following this, he made his competitive debut for Wolves in a League Cup extra time home win at the expense of Southend United on 24 August 2010. Three months later, he joined Sheffield United on loan for one month, where he would make just a single substitute league appearance before being recalled to Wolves' Premier League squad for games against Liverpool, West Ham United and Manchester City, where he was a substitute.

Loan to Sheffield Wednesday
Batth then went out on loan once again to Sheffield, only this time to arch-rivals Sheffield Wednesday. He joined the Owls on 16 March 2011 until the end of the season. His spell ended having made ten league appearances for the club.

Having impressed at Sheffield Wednesday during his loan stint the previous season, the club moved to re-sign him on loan once again, agreeing another six-month spell on 26 July 2011. In December 2011, the loan was extended to the end of the season, as the Owls challenged for promotion to the Championship. He scored in a 2–0 away win at Preston North End on New Year's Eve 2011, and a second league goal on 10 March 2012 in a 3–0 win against Bournemouth at Hillsborough. Batth finished his second stay at Sheffield Wednesday having totalled 49 appearances in all competitions, and having been part of their promotion as League One runners-up. He was voted runner-up in the club's "Player of the Season" award as a result of his fine season.

Return to Wolverhampton Wanderers
Batth began the 2012–13 season back at Wolves, with Sheffield Wednesday manager Dave Jones ruling out a return for the defender. Back in Wolves' colours, he scored the opening goal in a League Cup defeat of Northampton Town on 30 August 2012, and then scored his first league goal for Wolves with a late equaliser in a 2–2 draw with Leeds United on 9 February 2013. In his first full season in the Wolves first-team, Batth accumulated twelve league and two cup appearances in addition to his two goals. The club were however relegated from the Championship at the end of the campaign and took up the option on Batth's contract of an additional year.

Following Wolves' relegation to League One, the club took on a new look installing Kenny Jackett as head coach for the 2013–14 season. One of his first acts as manager was to give Batth the vice-captaincy at the club. Wolves enjoyed a hugely successful season and gained automatic promotion back to the Championship with four games to spare. Batth was the only ever-present in the promotion-winning side, playing all 46 games in a season which Wolves set a new points total record for League One, 103. In January 2014 he signed a long-term deal with the club that ran until summer 2017. Batth was also named in the PFA League One Team of the Year

The 2014–15 season was Batth's first as a regular in the Championship and his impressive form from the previous season continued. He remained as the only ever-present since Jackett's arrival, playing in every game of a side that had won 50 out of 86 games. Wolves got off to a flying start maintaining a play-off position until mid-November as Batth formed a solid partnership with Richard Stearman. The club held the best defensive record in the league for the majority of the season, keeping 15 clean sheets along the way. Batth's presence in the opposition box started to become more apparent as he netted three league goals including an 88th-minute equaliser at Molineux as Wolves drew 1–1 with Brighton & Hove Albion. A string of commanding performances led to strong rumors of interest from local rivals Aston Villa. At the age of just 24 years old, Batth bought up his century of appearances for the club in a 2–1 defeat to Birmingham City. Wolves continued to be in the hunt for the play-offs with two games to play of the season but missed out on goals scored to Ipswich Town. On 23 April it was revealed that Batth was facing a three-month layoff due to a stress fracture to his foot. Batth played 39 times for Wolves in 2015–16 as they finished in 14th position.

Batth scored in a 3–1 win against rivals Birmingham City on 20 August 2016. On 22 September 2016, the day after his 26th birthday, he signed a new four-year contract with Wolves to potentially tie him to the club until summer 2020. On 1 April 2017, Batth scored twice against Cardiff City moving Wolves eight points clear of the relegation zone. He scored in the final match of the 2016–17 season, a 1–0 win against Preston North End which secured 15th place for Wolves. Portuguese manager Nuno Espírito Santo was appointed ahead of the 2017–18 campaign which proved a very successful one for Wolves as they won the Championship title with 99 points.

Loan to Middlesbrough
On 31 August 2018, Batth returned to the Championship, after joining Middlesbrough on a season-long loan deal, after falling out of favour with Wolves, after they had been promoted to the Premier League. Batth made 13 appearances under Tony Pulis at Boro before his loan was cut short in January 2019.

Stoke City
Batth joined Stoke City on 29 January 2019 on a three-and-a-half year contract for a fee understood to be an initial £3 million. Batth made his Stoke debut on 2 February 2019 against Hull City and was given the captain's armband by Nathan Jones in the absence of Ryan Shawcross. Batth played 17 times in the remainder of the 2018–19 season as Stoke ended up finishing in 16th place. Batth helped improve the Potters defence with the side keeping eight clean sheets. He scored his first goal for Stoke in an EFL Cup tie against Leeds United on 27 August 2019. Stoke made a poor start to the 2019–20 season failing to win any of the first ten matches under Jones. Speaking in May 2020 Batth said he believed that Stoke made such a poor start because Jones brought in too many new players. Jones was replaced by Michael O'Neill in November and results began to improve. Batth scored in three of the final four matches as Stoke gained ten points to avoid relegation and finish in 15th position. In the 2020–21 season, Batth made 32 appearances as Stoke finished in 14th position.

Sunderland
On 18 January 2022, Batth joined League One side Sunderland on a free transfer, signing an eighteen-month deal. He scored his first goal for Sunderland against Cambridge United on 23 April 2022.

International career
While never representing England at any level, Batth is technically eligible to play for India through his father. However, he was left frustrated by Indian residency rules and passport regulations in July 2017, and has yet to play for the country.

Personal life
Batth is of mixed English and Punjabi descent. Batth set up his own charity in August 2017, Foundation DB, with his partner Natalie Ann Cutler, to raise money to combat homelessness in Wolverhampton.

Career statistics

Honours
Sheffield Wednesday
Football League One runner-up: 2011–12

Wolverhampton Wanderers
EFL Championship: 2017–18
Football League One: 2013–14

Sunderland
 EFL League One play-offs: 2022

Individual
Wolverhampton Wanderers Young Player of the Season: 2009–10
Football League One Team of the Season: 2013–14
PFA Team of the Year: 2013–14 League One

References

External links

1990 births
Association football defenders
British Asian footballers
Colchester United F.C. players
English Football League players
English footballers
English people of Indian descent
British sportspeople of Indian descent
Living people
Middlesbrough F.C. players
People from Brierley Hill
Punjabi people
English people of Punjabi descent
Sheffield United F.C. players
Sheffield Wednesday F.C. players
Stoke City F.C. players
Sunderland A.F.C. players
Wolverhampton Wanderers F.C. players